Aristeo Benavídez (12 February 1927 – 7 January 2019) was an Argentine alpine skier. He competed in the men's downhill at the 1952 Winter Olympics.

References

1927 births
2019 deaths
Argentine male alpine skiers
Olympic alpine skiers of Argentina
Alpine skiers at the 1952 Winter Olympics
Sportspeople from Bariloche